Suzanne Griesbach is a former French athlete, who was a walker, 1.62 m tall and 47 kg in weight, born April 22, 1945. She competes for club AS Strasbourg. She has 19 individual championship French titles in race walking.

prize list  
  42 caps for France A, between 1979 and 1990
  Record holder of France for 5 km walk.  She set this record 3 times, in 1982, in 1986 and in 1987.  Her 1987  record was 22 min 49 s 06   
 Record holder of France's 10 km walk.  She set this record 6 times, 1981, 1982,  1983,  1984, 1986 and 1987.  In 1987 her record was 47 min 16 s 8   
 Record holder of France for veterans 3 times, both on 5 km and  10 km walk between 1987 and 1990s
   Champion of France 5 km walk  8 consecutive times, from 1981 to 1988   
    Champion of France of the 10 km walk in 1981, 1982, 1983, 1984, 1986 and 1987   
    Champion of France of 3 km walk Indoors in 1983, 1985, 1986, 1987 and  1988

References
 
 
 

1945 births
Living people
French female racewalkers